Gismondine is a mineral with the chemical formula CaAl2Si2O8·4(H2O).  It is a zeolite or hydrated alumino-silicate.  It forms colorless, bipyramidal crystals of orthorhombic symmetry.

Gismondine was named for Italian mineralogist Carlo Giuseppe Gismondi (1762–1824).  It has been found in Iceland, Ireland, and Italy.

References
 Encyclopædia Britannica online entry
Gismondine data at webmineral.com

External links
Structure type GIS

Zeolites
Monoclinic minerals
Minerals in space group 14